Jack Delinger (June 22, 1926 – December 28, 1992) was an American professional bodybuilder. He won the 1949 AAU Mr. America and the 1956 Mr. Universe.

About
At 16 Delinger began training at the local YMCA. He looked to John Grimek for inspiration throughout his training. At Oakland Technical High School, Delinger was a member of the gymnastics team. Soon after, he joined Ed Yarick's gym. Yarick was a man whom Delinger looked up to and who was a role model for aspiring bodybuilders. In 1946 Delinger won his first contest, Mr. Northern California. Delinger had great upper body strength but it was noted that his legs were somewhat underdeveloped. With much hard work he corrected this problem. In 1949 he went on to win the AAU Mr. America. In 1956, at 30 years of age, Delinger won the NABBA Pro Mr. Universe. Delinger and his wife Loretta went on to open their own gym in Santa Barbara, California, and later at Broadway at College Avenue in Oakland, California.

Family
Delinger was married to Loretta Soper. Fifteen months after their marriage, the two had their only child named John. Their son died on November 23, 1992, at 41 years of age from a cerebral brain hemorrhage.

Death
Delinger died from a heart attack in Oakland, California on December 28, 1992, at the age of 66.

References

1926 births
1992 deaths
American bodybuilders
People associated with physical culture
Professional bodybuilders
Sportspeople from Oakland, California